Kazakhstan participated in the 16th Asian Games in Guangzhou from 12 November to 27 November 2010.

Medal table

Medalists

Archery

Men

Women

Athletics

Men 

Track events

Field events

Combined events

Women 

Track events

Field events

Beach volleyball

Men

Women

Boxing

Board games

Chess

Canoeing

Canoe-Kayak Flatwater 

Men

Women

Canoe-Kayak Slalom 

Men

Women

Cycling

Road 

Men

Women

Track 
Pursuits

Points races

Dancesport

Standard dance

Latin dance

Equestrian

Eventing

Fencing

Men

Women

Gymnastics

Artistic gymnastics 
Men
Individual Qualification & Team all-around Final

Individual

Rhythmic gymnastics 

Individual Qualification & Team all-around Final

Individual all-around

Trampoline 
Men

Handball

Women
Team
Assem BatyrbekovaGulzira IskakovaTatyana KonstantinovaYelena KozlovaNatalya KubrinaNatalya KulakovaKristina NedopekinaYevgeniya NikolayevaTatyana PerfenovaMarina PikalovaYelena PortovaDina SashurkovaYelena SuyazovaNatalya YakovlevaOlga YegunovaYevgeniya Zhulkina

Preliminary round

Group A

Semifinals

Bronze medal match

Hockey

Women
Team
Galiya BaissarinaAlissa CherkassovaAnastassiya ChserbakovaIrina DobriogloVera DomashnevaNatalya GataulinaGulnara ImangeliyevaAigerim MakhanovaYuliya MikheichikAliya MukhambetovaAlessya PyotukhNatalya SazontovaViktoriya ShaimardanovaYelena SvirskayaMariya TussubzhanovaOlga Zhizhina

Preliminary round

 Three players from Kazakhstan: Anastassiya Chsherbakova, Alessya Pyotukh and Yuliya Mikheichik were found guilty of representing Belarus in the 2010 World Cup Qualifiers earlier this year in Kazan, Russia . All matches that Kazakhstan lost below five goals margin was revised to 0–5 and those matches beyond that score are stand.

Judo

Men

* Shokir Muminov of Uzbekistan originally won the silver medal, but was disqualified after he tested positive for Methylhexanamine. Masahiro Takamatsu and Islam Bozbayev were raised to joint second and took silver medals.

Women

Karate

Men

Women

Modern Pentathlon

Women

Rowing

Men

Women

Rugby

Women
Team
Olga KumanikinaIrina RadzivilAmina BaratovaOlessya TeryayevaOlga SazonovaNigora NurmatovaMarianna BalashovaAnna YakovlevaSvetlana KlyuchnikovaLyudmila ShererIrina AmossovaIrina Adler

Preliminary round

Pool B

Quarterfinals

Semifinals

Gold medal match

Shooting

Men

Women

Swimming

Men

* Participated in the heats only.

Women

Synchronized swimming

Taekwondo

Men

Women

Triathlon

Volleyball

Men

Team
Asset BazarkulovVitaliy ErdshteinDmitriy GorbatkovMarat ImangaliyevNodirkhan KadirkhanovSergey KuznetsovVitaliy MironenkoAlexandr StolnikovYuriy StulovVitaliy VirodinSergey YembulayevAnton Yudin

Preliminary

Group B

Group B

|}

|}
Second round

Group H

|}

|}
Placement 9–12

|}
Placement 9th–10th

|}

Women

Team
Natalya ZhukovaSana JarlagassovaOlga NassedkinaOlessya ArslanovaKorinna IshimtsevaIrina LukomskayaYelena EzauMarina StorozhenkoYuliya KutskoLyudmila AnarbayevaInna MatveyevaOlga Dobryshevskaya

Preliminary

Group B

|}

|}
Quarterfinals

|}
Semifinals

|}
Bronze medal match

|}

Water polo

Men

Team
Alexandr ShvedovSergey GubarevAlexandr GaidukovMurat ShakenovAlexey PanfiliRoman PilipenkoAlexandr AxenovRustam UkumanovYevgeniy ZhilyayevMikhail RudayRavil ManafovAzamat ZhulumbetovNikolay Maximov

Preliminary

Group B

Quarterfinals

Semifinals

Gold medal match

Women

Team
Galina RytovaNatalya ShepelinaKamila ZakirovaAnna TurovaLiliya FalaleyevaAnna ZubkovaZamira MyrzabekovaYekaterina GariyevaAizhan AkilbayevaMarina GritsenkoYelena ChebotovaAssem MussarovaAlexandra Turova

Weightlifting

Wrestling

Men
Freestyle

Greco-Roman
{| class="wikitable" border="1" style="font-size:90%"
|-
!rowspan=2|Athlete
!rowspan=2|Event
!Round of 16
!Quarterfinals
!Semifinals
!Final
|-
!OppositionResult
!OppositionResult
!OppositionResult
!OppositionResult
|-
|Marat Karishalov
|55 kg
|align=center|L PO 0-3
|align=center|Did not advance
|align=center|Repechage Round 1 match:W ST 4-0
|align=center|Bronze medal match:W P0 3-0
|-
|Nurbakyt Tengizbayev
|60 kg
|align=center|BYE
|align=center|L PP 1-3
|align=center colspan="7"|did not advance
|-
|Darkhan Bayakhmetov
|66 kg
|align=center|W PO 3-0
|align=center|W PO 3-0
|align=center|W PO 3-0
|align=center|L PP 1-3
|-
|Roman Melyoshin
|74 kg
|align=center|W PO 3-0
|align=center|L PP 1-3
|align=center|Repechage Round 1 match:W PO 3-0
|align=center|Bronze medal match:L PP 1-3
|-
|Alkhazur Ozdiyev
|84 kg
|align=center|BYE
|align=center|W PO 3-0
|align=center|L PP 1-3
|align=center|Bronze medal match:W PP 3-1
|-
|Asset Mambetov
|96 kg
|align=center|BYE
|align=center|W PO 3-0
|align=center|W PO 3-0
|align=center|L PP 1-3''
|-
|Nurmakhan Tinaliyev
|120 kg
|align=center|W VT 5-0
|align=center|W PO 3-0
|align=center|W PP 3-1
|align=center|W PP 3-1
|}

Women
Freestyle

Wushu 

MenSanshouWomenChangquan'''

References

Nations at the 2010 Asian Games
2010
Asian Games